"Riverside" is a house song released by Dutch DJ Sidney Samson. The "Riverside, motherfucker!" proclamation is the voice of Tupac Shakur sampled from the film Juice (playtime 1:10:25). The song is often censored during prime time, to avoid causing offence.

A vocal mix has been made featuring Wizard Sleeve, released in the UK on 4 January 2010. The song name has been changed to "Riverside (Let's Go!)".

Many British radio stations, including BBC Radio 1, added "Riverside" to their playlists, and as such the single received a high amount of radio play throughout December 2009 and January 2010, in preparation for the single's release. The song entered the UK Singles Chart at No. 2 on 10 January 2010.

In January 2018, Samson collaborated with Tujamo to release a new version of the song titled "Riverside (Reloaded)". Later in the same year, Samson also partnered with Oliver Heldens to release another remake titled "Riverside 2099".

Music video
Released May 2009, the music video features two children who have been hired by 'The Godfather' to collect a package of lollipops from two women. After delivering the goods two lollipops short, 'The Godfather' chases the younger child through the streets, as one of the children sticks 'Riverside' stickers onto various items and eventually slaps a sticker on Sidney himself. The video ends with 'The Godfather' being hit by a Hummer H2. It was filmed on location in Arnhem, the Netherlands. This is visible as there is a fire hose marked 'brandslang' during the indoor chase scene, the cars have Dutch license plates and the clip shows a Dutch Police officer. Finally, at some point in the video clip, the chase takes place on the platform of train station Arnhem Presikhaaf. 
An additional music video has been made for the Wizard Sleeve version, which was directed by James Copeman. It features on screen painting of people and models walking with paintbrushes. You see Wizard Sleeve and Sidney Samson holding pictures and then the camera goes into that picture to reveal the model walking with Sidney Samson rapping in a painting behind her. It later has scenes with him and another model rapping.

Track listing
 "Riverside" (Explicit Edit) – 3:24
 "Riverside" (Afrojack Remix) – 5:31
 "Riverside" (Warren Clarke Remix) – 6:54
 "Riverside (Let's Go!)" (Dirty Extended Vocal Mix) – 5:09
 "Riverside (Let's Go!)" (Breakage Remix) – 4:11

Chart performance

Weekly charts

Year-end charts
Original version

Remix featuring Wizard Sleeve

Certifications

Release history

References

2009 singles
2010 singles
2009 songs
Data Records singles
Number-one singles in Scotland